Kirk Campbell (born March 22, 1986) is an American college football coach who is currently the quarterbacks coach for the University of Michigan Wolverines football team. He was previously the offensive coordinator and quarterbacks coach for Old Dominion from 2020 to 2021.

Personal 
Campbell was born in 1986 to Kevin and Cindy Campbell.  The youngest of three boys.  His older brothers are Kevin Campbell and Kellen Campbell.  He grew up in Pittsburgh, Pennsylvania, and attended West Allegheny Senior High School. He attended Mercyhurst University, where he played football as a wide receiver. Campbell graduated in 2008 with a degree in communications. He also earned a masters degree in business administration and management from Tiffin University, graduating in 2012.  
On June 30,2017, Campbell married Lauren (Schiefelbein) Campbell a graphic designer.  He and his wife have a daughter Riley.

Coaching career
Campbell began his coaching career as graduate assistant at West Virginia Wesleyan College from 2009 to 2010. He then coached the wide receivers and tight ends at Tiffin in 2011. From 2012 to 2016, he was the offensive coordinator and assistant head coach at Alderson Broaddus University. He spent five months during the offseason as the head coach at Alderson Broaddus before taking a job at Penn State as an offensive analyst, where he spent 3 seasons from 2017 to 2019. 

Campbell was hired in January 2020 to serve as the offensive coordinator and quarterbacks coach for Old Dominion.
He held that position from 2020 to 2021. Campbell was let go by Old Dominion in November 2021. 

Campbell joined the staff at Michigan as an offensive analyst for the 2022 season.  He was promoted in January 2023 to serve as the program's quarterbacks coach.

References

1986 births
Living people
American football wide receivers
Alderson Broaddus Battlers football
Mercyhurst Lakers football players
Michigan Wolverines football coaches
Old Dominion Monarchs football coaches
Penn State Nittany Lions football coaches
Tiffin Dragons football coaches
West Virginia Wesleyan Bobcats football coaches
Tiffin University alumni
Coaches of American football from Pennsylvania
Players of American football from Pittsburgh